Eva-Maria Hagen (19 October 1934 – 16 August 2022) was a German actress and singer. She was known as the "Brigitte Bardot of the GDR" but was banned from performance for political reasons.

Life
Hagen was born Eva-Maria Buchholz in Költschen (present-day Poland) on 19 October 1934, the daughter of farm workers from East Brandenburg. In 1945, Költschen was occupied by the Soviet army and the family was expelled. They moved to Perleberg, which became part of the GDR in 1949.

In 1952, after completing an apprenticeship as a machinist, she was trained at the Ernst Busch Academy of Dramatic Arts in Berlin. She joined the Berliner Ensemble in 1953. Hagen made her theater debut in 1953 in Erwin Strittmatter's play Katzgraben directed by Bertolt Brecht at the Berliner Ensemble.

In 1957, she made her film debut in Kurt Maetzig's comedy Don't Forget My Little Traudel. Her film career led to her being called the "Brigitte Bardot of the GDR". From 1958, she acted at the Maxim Gorki Theater in Berlin. At the Landestheater Dessau, she had continued success as the flower girl Eliza in the musical My Fair Lady.

In 1965, she met Wolf Biermann. Despite becoming a successful film actress she was sidelined because of her relationship with Biermann. He was a singer-songwriter whose politics kept him unemployed. In 1972, Biermann and Hagen separated. In 1976, she publicly protested against Biermann's expatriation. She was dismissed without notice from the German television broadcaster Deutscher Fernsehfunk (DFF) in the GDR and banned from working. In 1977, Hagen's citizenship in the GDR was revoked, and she moved to West Germany the same year. 

She built up a second career as a chanson singer in addition to film and theater. After the fall of the Berlin Wall, Hagen made films in Babelsberg again, appeared on stage as Medea or Mother Courage or sang Brecht songs. She painted in oil and went on reading tours with her own books.

Personal 
In 1954 she married Hans Oliva-Hagen and they had a child named Catherine, singer and actress Nina Hagen. She divorced him in 1959 over psychological issues. 

Hagen lived in Hamburg, Berlin and the Uckermark. She is the grandmother of Cosma Shiva Hagen.

Hagen died on 16 August 2022 in Hamburg, at the age of 87.

Awards
 1999 Carl Zuckmayer Medal for her autobiographical book Eva and the Wolf

Selected filmography
Sources:

 Don't Forget My Little Traudel (1957) as Traudel
 Spur in die Nacht (1957) as Sabine
 Goods for Catalonia (1959) as Marion Stöckel
 The Dress (1961) as Katrin
 Reise ins Ehebett (1966) as Mary Lou
 Meine Freundin Sybille (1967) as Helena
 The Banner of Krivoi Rog (1967) as Elfriede
 The Legend of Paul and Paula (1973)
  (1980) as Gibbi's Mother
 Herzlich willkommen (1990) as Secretary
  (2009) as Lena Braake

Books

References

Further reading

External links
 

1934 births
2022 deaths
20th-century German actresses
21st-century German actresses
German film actresses
German women singers
German television actresses
Hagen family
People from Sulęcin County
People from the Province of Brandenburg